A list of films released in Japan in 1972 (see 1972 in film).

See also 
1972 in Japan
1972 in Japanese television

References

Footnotes

Sources

External links
Japanese films of 1972 at the Internet Movie Database

1972
Lists of 1972 films by country or language
Films